The 1930 German Ice Hockey Championship was the 14th season of the German Ice Hockey Championship, the national championship of Germany. Berliner Schlittschuhclub won the championship by defeating SC Brandenburg Berlin in the final.

First round

Group A

Group B

3rd place

Final

References

External links
German ice hockey standings 1912-1932

Ger
German Ice Hockey Championship seasons
Ice hockey